AS Mabela a Bana is a football club in Mwene-Ditu, Democratic Republic of Congo. In the 2006/2007 season they played in the Linafoot, the top level of professional football in DR Congo.

Achievements
Kasaï-Oriental Provincial League: 1
 2006

References 

Football clubs in the Democratic Republic of the Congo